"Killer Whale" is the twenty-sixth episode of the second series of the 1960s cult British spy-fi television series The Avengers, starring Patrick Macnee and Honor Blackman. It originally aired on ABC on 23 March 1963. The episode was directed by Kim Mills and written by John Lucarotti.

Plot
Steed investigates a possible link between the proprietors of a boxing ring and the illegal smuggling of ambergris.

Cast
 Patrick Macnee as John Steed
 Honor Blackman as Cathy Gale
 Patrick Magee as Sam 'Pancho' Driver
 John Bailey as Fernand
 Kenneth Farrington as Joey Frazer
 Morris Perry as Harry
 John Tate as Willie
 Julie Paulle as Angela
 Christopher Coll as Laboratory assistant
 Robert Mill as Brown
 Fredric Abbott as Sailor
 Lyndall Goodman as Receptionist
 Brian Mason as Tiger

References

External links

Episode overview on The Avengers Forever! website

The Avengers (season 2) episodes
1963 British television episodes